Typhlocypris cavicola is a species of ostracod crustacean in the family Candonidae. It is endemic to Slovenia, where it is only known from Krka Cave.

References

Candonidae
Freshwater crustaceans of Europe
Crustaceans described in 1935
Endemic fauna of Slovenia
Taxonomy articles created by Polbot
Taxobox binomials not recognized by IUCN